Rio is an album by Uri Caine which was recorded and released on the Winter & Winter label in 2001. The album explores Brazilian music, and features of large ensemble of Brazilian musicians with an emphasis on percussion.

Reception

In his review for Allmusic, Glenn Astarita notes that "With this effort, Caine seemingly derives inspiration from the rhythmic structures while melding his thematic inventions into the percussionists' temporal planes. Nonetheless, the artist captures and illustrates the less commercial side of what might be considered indigenous Brazilian music".

On All About Jazz C. Michael Bailey said "The Brazilian music presented here is not the plush Bossa one would expect. It is more of an abstract look at the indigenous popular music, that music that might have less appeal in the United States if entrusted in lesser hands that Caines. The excellent results are a collections of Brazilian vignettes, little Latin confections finely crafted to be had and eaten too. Caine surrounds himself with Brazilian musicians, most particularly percussionists who weave their special magic throughout the music. It is as if we are privy to a Rio radio dial, spinning form one station to the next and listening every once and awhile". Writing in JazzTimes, Bill Shoemaker observed, "Playing both piano and Fender Rhodes, Caine is joined by a revolving cast of musicians, singers and drum choruses who consistently coax rhythmically vibrant performances from him. At slower tempi, Caine caresses the lyrical soul of Brazilian music with obvious affection. Rio is a virtual hour in the sun".

Track listing
All compositions by Uri Caine except as indicated
 "Samba do Mar" (Uri Caine e Unidos da Vila Isabel) - 4:35
 "Dia de Praia" - 4:49
 "Teu Chamego" - 5:42
 "Revolucionário" (Paulo Braga) - 3:55
 "Bondinho de Santa Tereza" (Traditional) - 3:16    
 "Combatente" (Maurício Pacheco, Pedro D-Lita) - 4:07
 "Samba do Fogo" (Uri Caine e Unidos da Vila Isabel) - 3:12  Rdio   
 "Raquel" - 5:31
 "Arpoador" - 5:05  Rdio   
 "Assalto Cultural" (Uri Caine / Odélio Antônio Jr., Paulo Henrique Deptuesou, Antônio Carlos L. Roca) - 3:40
 "Na Lapa" (Ricardo Curtz, Ericson Pires, Claudio Monjope, Tiago Didac, Uri Caine) - 3:09
 "Samba da Terra" (Uri Caine e Unidos da Vila Isabel) - 3:31  Rdio   
 "Um Minuto Só" (Jairzinho Oliveira) - 4:02
 "Choro Maluco" (Paulo Braga) - 5:05
 "Samba da Rua" (Traditional) - 1:39
 "Akalanguiado" (Paulo Braga) - 3:32
 "Adeus" - 1:30
 "Samba do Vento" (Uri Caine e Unidos da Vila Isabel) - 2:38

Personnel
Uri Caine - piano, teclado Fender Rhodes
Paulo Braga - bateria, percussão
Jorge Helder - baixo
Lula Galvão - violão
Jair Oliveira - violão, voz
Kacau Gomes, Cris Delanno - voz
Humberto Cazes - percussão, pandeiro, reco - reco de mola, tamborim, triangulo
Unidos da Vila Isabel
Grupo Corpo Movimento Capoeira
Morro do Cantagalo
Stereo Maracanã
Assalto Cultural
Hapax
Arcos da Lapa
Músicos do Morro dos Prazeres

References

Winter & Winter Records albums
Uri Caine albums
2001 albums